Israella Kafui Mansu is a reputed young female entrepreneur in Ghana, Founder and CEO of Mansuki Ghana Ltd.

Early life 

Israella Kafui Mansu was born on 26 October 1985 in Sogakope in Ghana and moved to Liberia with the family whiles young. Unfortunately it was during that period that the war broke in Liberia so the family moved back to Ghana.
At age 6 she enrolled in Sogasco Primary in Sogakope, moved to Dabala Primary and JHS and later St. Francis Demonstration JHS in Hohoe, where she took her BECE all due to the transfers her mother had to go through as a school matron. After successfully passing her exams, she gained admission into Anfoega senior high school in the Kpando District to study Home Economics and completed her tertiary education at the University of Ghana, Legon with a Bachelor of Arts degree in Consumer Science and Psychology.

Educational Achievements 

Whiles in school, Israella continues to distinguish herself among peers. Whiles Dabala JHS, the school selected her to represent them in the annual STME (Science Technology and Mathematics Education) program run by the government to empower young people especially girls and also represented her school in district examinations and competitions. In Anfoega SHS she also partook in an open literature competition meant for the whole school where she wrote a creative story and successfully placed third even when majority that took part were boys and seniors.

Entrepreneurship 

Since 2009 Israella has built a reputed brand with her company on both the local and international market. As an entrepreneur, she researches into natural cosmetic products, design and commercialize them. 
After completing her National service duties in 2009, Israella thrived to get a job but to no avail. This circumstance motivated her and with as little capital of GHS300 which she gathered from savings during her National Service exercise she started her first company using her kitchen as a laboratory where she formulated and prepared the first few cosmetic products In an exclusive interview she had with Akpah Prince she said “In starting the company, I had two main visions in mind to make money to survive and create jobs to employ people because the rate of unemployment in the country now is just so high and pathetic, so these factors motivated me to start this very company”.

Recognition 

In 2012, Israella participated in Enablis Ghana's Business Launch Pad competition and Ghana Startup Cup where she placed second and first runner-up respectively.
In 2013 she was awarded at a ceremony in South Africa by the deputy minister of Trade and the European Women Inventors and Innovation Association in Sweden.
In 2014 participated in the launch of the YES  initiative by the Ghana government where she sat on right hand side of the president. She has featured on television shows in Ghana as well as documentaries on Young Entrepreneurs in Ghana and Africa. She has also participated the US Embassy Ghana programs and has shared her story on many speaking platforms.
She is also currently in the final six participants on the Ghana's Next Young Entrepreneurs Reality Show in Ghana.

Exports 

Leading in the production of Made in Ghana goods, Israella occasionally exports her cosmetic products into other African countries, Asia, the US and the European markets. Her products go as far as pushing Ghana out there by raising the flag of Ghana very high.

Conclusion 

Israella Kafui Mansu is passionate about solving developmental challenges, creating sustainable employment and coaching young entrepreneurs.

References 

1985 births
Ghanaian businesspeople
Women business executives
University of Ghana alumni
Living people
People from Volta Region